CCTV-14 is a Chinese free-to-air television channel that was launched on 28 December 2003 and is owned by the China Central Television. It airs animated films and series as well as kids game shows and other young-oriented programmes, including The Beachbuds, Super Wings, Aggretsuko, Ben and Holly's Little Kingdom. Willa's Wild Life, and Octonauts.

Before its launch, CCTV children's programs were broadcast on CCTV-7.

History

Test transmissions of the channel were started on 8 December 2003. Its first broadcast was made on 10 December 2003 with a duration of 16 hours. CCTV-14 was formally launched on 28 December 2003 as CCTV-Children and was split from CCTV-7. Starting 1 January 2011, the channel was rebranded as CCTV-14.

From 2013 onwards, CCTV-14 has carried CCTV New Year's Gala.

In August 2019, the channel produced an adapted version of The Selfish Giant, titled The Giants Garden, a live musical phenomenon with a cast of nearly 300 of Shanghai's top child actors.  It was presented in English instead of Mandarin and broadcast to all of the People's Republic of China.  The show was met with acclaim, and aided in installing a yearly tradition of the channel producing a musical to be broadcast entirely in English with original music.

Programmes
 CCTV New Year's Gala (live television on last day of the last month with simulcast on CCTV-1, CCTV-3, CCTV-4, CCTV-7 and CCTV-4k (UHD))

References 

China Central Television channels
Children's television channels in the Asia Pacific
Television channels and stations established in 2003
2003 establishments in China